Mathesberg is a mountain of Hesse, located in the Rhön Mountains, Germany.

Mountains of Hesse
Mountains and hills of the Rhön